The Talking Mother Goose was an animated character toy created by Alchemy II and released by Worlds of Wonder in 1986. 

Mother Goose, voiced by Russi Taylor, used classic fairytales and rhymes to entertain and support children as they learned to read. 

The toy is controlled via encoded cassette tapes, loaded beneath the wing, which instruct the movements of the toy. 

Two versions of Mother Goose were released, both of which featured animated eyes and beak. The first version - commonly referred to as a 'head turner' - has the ability to move its head left and right. This feature was removed from the second version.

Books and Tapes 
Mother Goose was a learning aid and encouraged children to read along in the book which accompanied each cassette tape. She would emit a distinctive 'Honk Honk' sound to indicate the end of each page. 

A total of 21 book and tape sets were released for Mother Goose, two of which could incorporate Hector. 

 The Ugly Duckling (operates Hector)
 The Tortoise & the Hare
 Peter & the Wolf
 The Princess and the Pea
 The Frog Prince
 Jack and the Beanstalk
 The Little Red Hen
 Lullabies
 Rumpelstiltskin
 Little Red Riding Hood
 The Emperor's New Clothes
 Cinderella
 The Sleeping Beauty
 Rapunzel
 The Shoemaker and the Elves
 Beauty and the Beast
 Goldilocks and the Three Bears
 Hansel and Gretel
 The Golden Touch
 The Grasshopper and the Ant
 Birthday Surprise (operates Hector)

Special Collector Editions  
Two themed book and tape sets were released. 'Birthday Surprise' and 'Lullabies' each included a bonnet and collar for Mother Goose.

Hector 
In 1987, Hector - The Ugly Duckling, was released by Worlds of Wonder as a companion to Mother Goose. He was accompanied by 'The Three Little Kittens' cassette which operates both toys. 

Modelled on the ugly duckling fairytale, Hector is a grey cygnet with animated eyes and beak. While similar to Mother Goose in his animatronic actions, Hector does not feature a cassette tape player and requires a wired connection to Mother Goose to operate. 

With Hector, Worlds of Wonder expanded into nursery rhymes and arguably a younger audience, with Hector becoming the main character and Mother Goose the supporting narrator. 

Only Hector compatible tapes are capable of operating the pair, this includes 'The Ugly Duckling' cassette released with Mother Goose herself. 

Seven cassette and book sets were created for Hector. 

 The Three Little Kittens
 Little Bo Peep
 Hickory Dickory Dock
 Little Boy Blue
 Hey Diddle Diddle
 Mistress Mary
 Little Miss Muffet

1980s toys
Worlds of Wonder (toy company) products
Products introduced in 1986